This is a list of Italian chefs:

A
 Andrea Accordi 
 Massimiliano Alajmo 
 Andrea Apuzzo

B
 Lidia Bastianich
 Massimo Bottura
 Bruno Barbieri

C
 Antonino Cannavacciuolo
 Massimo Capra
 Caesar Cardini
 Antonio Carluccio
 Pasquale Carpino
 Cesare Casella
 Gianfranco Chiarini
 Gennaro Contaldo
 Salvatore Cuomo
Gennaro Contaldo

D
 Gino D'Acampo
 Attilio di Fabrizio
Anna Del Conte

E
 Raffaele Esposito

F
 Mario Frittoli

L
 Antonio Latini
 Giorgio Locatelli

M
 Gualtiero Marchesi
 Martino da Como
Filippo Mazzei

P
 Renato Piccolotto
Marco Pierre White

R
 Giovanni Rana 
 Gian Franco Romagnoli

S
 Bartolomeo Scappi

V
  Maurizio Vasco

W
 Heinz Winkler

Z
 Aldo Zilli

See also
 List of Italian restaurants
 List of Italian dishes

References

Chefs
 
Chefs